The Irish Amateur Open Championship is an amateur golf tournament held annually in Ireland and organised by the Golf Ireland. The championship has been played as a 72-hole stroke-play event since 1958. Previously it was played as a match-play tournament.

Golf Ireland also runs the Irish Amateur Close Championship which is restricted to players born in (or with a parent born in) Ireland or, at the discretion of Golf Ireland, resident in Ireland for at least five years.

History
The Golfing Union of Ireland was founded in late 1891 and organised their first championship meeting at Portrush in 1892, which included an open amateur championship. The championship was held from 7 to 9 September. There were 32 entries, with two 18-hole match-play rounds on each of the first two days and an 18-hole final on the third day. Two Scottish golfers contested the final, with Alexander Stuart beating John Andrew by one hole.

The 1893 championship was held from 13 to 15 September. There were 35 entries which meant that three preliminary matches were required. The final was extended to 36 holes. Considerable interest was added by the entry of John Ball, a three-time winner of the Amateur Championship and the 1890 Open champion. He went on to win the event, winning the final 8&7. Ball reached the final again in 1894 at Royal Dublin, this time winning the final 9&7, adding the title to the Amateur Championship he had won earlier in the year. On six occasions between 1894 and 1901, the Irish Championship Meeting included a professional tournament as well as the Amateur Championship. The 1895 championship at Portrush attracted 64 entries and the event was expanded to four days. Ball played again but lost at the last-32 stage to Ranald Gilroy, a young Scottish golfer. Gilroy lost in the semi-final to William B. Taylor who went on the win the final 13&11. Taylor retained the title in 1896, again winning the final by a large margin, this time 9&8.

Harold Hilton made his first appearance in 1897 at Royal Dublin and won the title. William B Taylor won the third time in 1898, although only beating Richard Dallmeyer at the 37th hole. All his three successes came in the absence of John Ball and Hilton. Ball and Hilton both played in 1899 at Portmarnock. Hilton was surprisingly beaten in the semi-final by John Williamson, losing at the final hole. Ball beat Williamson 12&11 in a one-sided final. Ball was unable to defend his title in 1900 as he was serving in the Second Boer War. Hilton won the title, beating Sidney Fry 11&9 in the final. Hilton retained the title in 1901 and again in 1902, his fourth win. Hilton played again at Portmarnock in 1903 but lost in the quarter-finals to local player Henry Boyd. Boyd completed the first 8 holes in 30 strokes to be 5 holes up and eventually won 3&2. Boyd became the first Irish finalist but lost a close match to George Wilkie by one hole. The 1904 final was contested between James Worthington and James Mitchell. Mitchell led by 3 holes after the morning round but Worthington won 9 of the 14 holes in the afternoon to win 6&4.

The 1905 meeting was moved to early August to try to attract more of the leading British golfers. However it failed to do so and Henry Boyd and James Mitchell, the losing finalists in 1903 and 1904 met in the 1905 final. Boyd won the match 3&2 and became the first Irish winner. Herbert Barker won in 1906, beating the 1904 champion, James Worthington, in an all-English final. Two Scots won in 1907 and 1908, Douglas Brown followed by James Mitchell, the 1904 and 1905 runner-up. Lionel Munn became the second Irish winner in 1909, beating the Scot, Robert Garson, in the final. Munn led by 5 holes after the morning round and was still 4 up with 9 holes to play. The match, however, went to the final hole, Munn winning by two holes. Munn retained the title in 1910, beating Gordon Lockhart in the final. Munn led by 8 holes after the morning round and won 9&7. Munn won the third successive time in 1911, beating Michael Scott in the final. Scott was recently returned from Australia where he had enjoyed considerable success. Munn led by one hole after the morning round but dominated in the afternoon, winning 7&6. There was an all-Scottish final in 1912, with Gordon Lockhart winning. Charles Palmer won in 1913, beating Lou Phillips, an ex-Welsh rugby union international, in the final.

The championship resumed in 1919 and was won by the English golfer Carl Bretherton who beat Tommy Armour in the final at Portrush. Political troubles in Ireland saw a reduction in the number of leading non-Irish amateurs competing and the 1920 event produced the first all-Irish final with Noel Martin winning. Martin won again in 1923 and with Charles Hezlet winning in 1926 and 1929 and Wilson Smyth, Alfred Lowe, Edwin Spiller and Roy McConnell also winning, the 1920s produced eight Irish winners. the two non-Irish winners were Tony Torrance, who won in 1925 and Seymour Noon who won in 1928. The early 1930s produced a series of non-Irish winners. William Sutton won an all-English final in 1930 and there were five successive Scottish winners from 1931 to 1935. Eric McRuvie won in 1931 with Jack McLean winning in 1932 and 1933 and Hector Thomson in 1934 and 1935. The 1936 event clashed with the Walker Cup in which McLean and Thomson were playing and the championship produced an all-Irish final won by Joe Brown. There were further Irish winners in 1937 and 1938 with wins by Johnnie Fitzsimmons and Jimmy Bruen. The 1939 event was due to start at Portmarnock on 4 September but was cancelled following the start of World War II.

The event resumed in 1946. A Scot, Alex Kyle, reached the final in 1946 but otherwise all finals from 1946 to 1957 were contested by Irish players. Joe Carr won four times and was in three other finals. Cecil Ewing won twice in 1948 and 1951, while Norman Drew won in 1952 and 1953. In an attempt to attract more overseas players, the championship became a 72-hole stroke-play event in 1958. Planned for three days in late-August it was extended to four days by bad weather, and was won by Tom Craddock. Johnny Duncan won in 1959, five strokes ahead of Archibald Gordon. In late June 1960, Portmarnock hosted the Canada Cup. The Irish close championship was moved to the late August date and the amateur open was cancelled. Later in 1960 the GUI decided to discontinue the event, despite protests from the Leinster delegates.

The event was revived at Fota Island in 1995 and was won by Pádraig Harrington. Louis Oosthuizen won in 2002 while Rory McIlroy lost in a playoff in 2006.

Winners

The 1892 final was played over 18 holes. From 1893 finals were played over 36 holes.

Source:

References

External links

Amateur golf tournaments
Golf tournaments in Ireland
Annual sporting events in Ireland
Recurring sporting events established in 1892
1892 establishments in Ireland
Spring (season) events in the Republic of Ireland